Dingee is a town in northern Victoria, Australia.

Dingee Post Office opened on 12 December 1883, on the arrival of the railway and the opening of Dingee station.

Golfers play at the Calival Golf Club at Dingee.

References

External links

Towns in Victoria (Australia)
Shire of Loddon